Cabarita Beach is a town in northeastern New South Wales which occupies a thin strip of beach-side land along the Coral Sea coast, east of Tweed Coast Road, in the Tweed Shire town of Bogangar.  Locally, the names Cabarita Beach and Bogangar are interchangeable;  either may be used when referring to the whole settlement, with more people using the former. Hastings Point lies close to Cabarita Beach to the south and Casuarina to the north. At the  Cabarita Beach had a population of 103, Bogangar 3060. Cabarita Beach is located within the Tweed Shire Local Government Authority.

The beach itself, as well as the nearby Norries Headland, are popular tourist attractions. The surfing spot to the north of the headland is also very popular.

The first major development in Cabarita Beach was the original Cabarita Hotel, opened on 17 December 1960. The original Cabarita Hotel has since been replaced by a modern, glass, chrome, and concrete structure.

History
Cabarita is an Aboriginal word, which means by the water. David Anderson, a private of the New South Wales Corps was granted land in the Cabarita Beach area in 1795. The area around Cabarita Point was reserved in 1856 for recreation.

Since then, Cabarita Beach has remained a coastal town for its relaxed beach lifestyle.

See also
Bogangar
Cabarita Beach Surf Life Saving Club
Northern Rivers

References

Towns in New South Wales
Suburbs of Tweed Heads, New South Wales
Coastal towns in New South Wales